Roland Hipkins (1894–1951) was an English artist who worked extensively in New Zealand between 1922 and 1951. He is especially noted for his work done in the wake of the 1931 'Hawkes Bay Earthquake’. Works by Hipkins are held by the Hawkes Bay Cultural Trust, the Royal College of Art. London, and the Sarjeant Art Gallery, Wanganui,

Education 
Hipkins was born at Coseley, in the West Midlands of England on 25 November 1894. He studied at the Bilston School of Art before serving as a soldier in Malta and France between 1915 and 1918.  In September  1919 he enrolled at the Royal College of Art, London and in 1921 produced a woodcut titled ‘Mining’ for the student magazine published by the Royal College of Art. After completing his studies in July 1922 he moved to Napier, New Zealand.

Career 

Hipkins took up the position of Art teacher at the Napier technical College in 1922 and helped establish the ‘Napier Society of Arts and Crafts’ in 1923. Hipkins arrived in Napier in 1922 as one of a number of La Trobe artists brought to New Zealand to improve the teaching of art in the country. Other artists who came under the scheme included Robert Nettleton Field, Christopher Perkins and Francis Shurrock.

During his eight-year stay in Napier he met the Scottish artist Jenny Campbell. They were married on 5 November 1924 and together they exhibited works at the New Zealand Academy of Fine Arts in 1927.

In 1930 they moved to Wellington where he was appointed as an art teacher at the Technical School of Art. In the wake of the 'Hawkes Bay Earthquake’ which decimated Napier in February 1931, Hipkins returned to the town where he made numerous sketches and began work on Renaissance (1932) one of the more important art works to record the event. "Renaissance' was exhibited at the National Centennial Exhibition of New Zealand Art in 1940.

Hipkins did not produce a large number of finished works over the course of his life and ill health in his final years further reduced his output. He died in Wellington on 19 May 1951.

Exhibitions 
Campbell exhibited with the:    
Canterbury Society of Arts, 46th Annual Exhibition, Christchurch, 1926
Canterbury Society of Arts, Christchurch, 1932
Auckland Society of Arts, 56th Annual Exhibition, 1937.
The New Zealand Academy for Fine Arts, Wellington, Annual Exhibition, 1939.
Centennial Exhibition of International and New Zealand Art, 1939–1940, National Art Gallery, Wellington.

References 

1894 births
1951 deaths
British Army soldiers
20th-century New Zealand painters
20th-century New Zealand male artists
People from Coseley
Alumni of the Royal College of Art
British emigrants to New Zealand
British Army personnel of World War I
Military personnel from Staffordshire